Aamer or Amer is a name, used both as a surname and given name. Notable people with the name include:

Aamer as surname 
Ali Aamer (born 1977), Bahraini footballer
Mohamed Aamer (born 1986), Egyptian actor
Mohammad Aamer (born 1965), Pakistani cricketer
Mohammad Aamer (born 1979), Pakistani cricketer
Mohammad Aamer (born 1993), Pakistani cricketer
Mohammad Aamer (born 1995), Pakistani cricketer
Mohammad Aamer (born 1998), Pakistani cricketer
Najeeb Amar (born 1971), Pakistani cricketer
Shaker Aamer (born 1966), Saudi Arabian Guantanamo prisoner

Aamer as given name 
Aamer Ali (born 1978), Omani cricketer
Aamer Anwar (born 1967), British lawyer
Aamer Bashir (1972–2010), Pakistani cricketer
Aamer Butt (born 1971), Pakistani cricketer
Aamer Butt (born 1977), Pakistani cricketer
Aamer Farooq (born 1969), Pakistani jurist
Aamer Gul (born 1974), Pakistani cricketer
Aamer Hameed (born 1954), Pakistani cricketer
Aamer Hanif (born 1967), Pakistani cricketer
Aamer Hayat (born 1982), Pakistani cricketer
Aamer Hussein (born 1955), Pakistani writer
Aamer Iqbal (born 1973), Pakistani cricketer
Aamer Ishaq (born 1971), Pakistani cricketer
Aamer Khan (born 1969), English cricketer
Aamer Khurshid (born 1967), Pakistani cricketer
Aamer Mahmood (born 1977), Pakistani cricketer
Aamer Majeed (born 1969), Pakistani cricketer
Aamer Malik (born 1963), Pakistani cricketer
Aamer Nazir (born 1966), Pakistani cricketer
Aamer Nazir (born 1971), Pakistani cricketer
Aamer Rahman (born 1982), Australian comedian
Aamer Sajjad (born 1981), Pakistani cricketer
Aamer Sohail (born 1966), Pakistani cricketer
Aamer Sohail (born 1972), Pakistani cricketer
Aamer Yousuf (born 1985), Pakistani cricketer
Raja Aamer Zaman, Pakistani politician

Arabic-language surnames